Chloromethyl methyl ether (CMME) is a compound with formula CH3OCH2Cl.  A colorless liquid, it is a chloroalkyl ether.  It is used as an alkylating agent. In organic synthesis, it is used for introducing the methoxymethyl ether (MOM) protecting group, and is thus often called MOM-Cl or MOM chloride.  It also finds application as a chloromethylating agent in some variants of the Blanc chloromethylation.

Preparation
A convenient synthesis of chloromethyl methyl ether in situ involves the reaction of dimethoxymethane and acetyl chloride in the presence of a Lewis acid catalyst  This route affords a methyl acetate solution of chloromethyl methyl ether of high purity.  A similar method, using a high-boiling acyl chloride, can be used to prepare pure, dimethoxymethane being the only contaminant.  In contrast, the classical procedure reported in Organic Syntheses employing formaldehyde, methanol, and hydrogen chloride yields material significantly contaminated with the dangerous bis(chloromethyl) ether and requires fractional distillation.

Safety
The amount of time required to destroy residual chloromethyl methyl ether using various standard aqueous quench solutions (ammonium chloride solution, water, and sodium carbonate solution) has been measured.  In all cases, a solution of chloromethyl methyl ether in toluene/methyl acetate was destroyed (to within detection limit) after vigorous stirring with the quench solution for 15 minutes.

CMME is a known human carcinogen. Chronic exposure can increase the incidence of respiratory cancers, including small cell carcinoma. It is one of 13 chemicals regulated by the Occupational Safety and Health Administration despite not having an established permissible exposure limit.

It is classified as an extremely hazardous substance in the United States as defined in Section 302 of the U.S. Emergency Planning and Community Right-to-Know Act (42 U.S.C. 11002), and is subject to strict reporting requirements by facilities which produce, store, or use it in significant quantities. It listed in Schedule 1 Part 1 of Canada's Prohibition of Certain Toxic Substances Regulations.

References

Reagents for organic chemistry
Alkylating agents
Protecting groups
Organochlorides
Ethers
IARC Group 1 carcinogens